Abdel Rahman Shokry (12 October 1886 – 16 December 1958) was an Egyptian poet from the Diwan school of poets.

Early life
He was born in Port Said and he travelled to England where he got his Bachelor of Arts from the University of Sheffield.

Career
He believed that poetry must be renewed and freed from the one-rhyme system in Arabic poetry. There were seven poetry books for him, including "Light of The Dawn" in 1909 and "Flower of The Spring" in 1916.

He abandoned poetry after a dispute with his two colleagues in this school, Ibrahim Al-Mazini and Abbas el-Akkad, until his death.

External links (Arabic) 
 https://web.archive.org/web/20060823130335/http://www.albabtainpoeticprize.org/poetDetails.aspx?ptId=361

References 
 https://web.archive.org/web/20060721071401/http://www.albabtainpoeticprize.org/.

1886 births
1958 deaths
Egyptian male poets
People from Port Said
20th-century Egyptian poets
20th-century male writers
Egyptian expatriates in the United Kingdom